Jersey Falcons were an American soccer team, founded in 2001. The team was a member of the United Soccer Leagues Premier Development League (PDL), the fourth tier of the American Soccer Pyramid, until 2004, when the team left the league and the franchise was terminated.

They played their home games in the stadium at New Jersey City University in Jersey City, New Jersey. The team's colors were red and white, representing their strong links to the local Polish community in the area.

Year-by-year

Coaches
  Greg Bajek 2003–04

Stadia
 Ted Cooper Field, Linden, New Jersey 2003 (4 games)
 Rexplex Complex, Elizabeth, New Jersey 2003 (3 games)
 Stadium at Kean University, Union, New Jersey 2003 (1 game)
 Stadium at New Jersey City University, Jersey City, New Jersey 2004

References

Soccer clubs in New Jersey
Defunct Premier Development League teams
2001 establishments in New Jersey
2004 disestablishments in New Jersey
Sports in Hudson County, New Jersey
Polish association football clubs outside Poland